David Carl Allison (February 25, 1961 – July 13, 1993) was an American NASCAR driver. He was best known for driving the No. 28 Texaco-Havoline Ford for Robert Yates Racing in the NASCAR Cup Series. Born in Hollywood, Florida, he was the oldest of four children born to Bobby and Judy Allison. The family moved to Hueytown, Alabama, and along with Bobby Allison's brother, Donnie, Red Farmer and Neil Bonnett, became known as the Alabama Gang.

Early career
Growing up, Allison participated in athletics, preferring football, but settled upon automobile racing. He began working for his father's NASCAR Winston Cup Series team after graduating high school, and built a race car of his own, a Chevy Nova, with friends known as the "Peach Fuzz Gang". He began his career in 1979 at Birmingham International Raceway and won his first race in his sixth start. He became a regular winner at BIR, and by 1983 was racing in the Automobile Racing Club of America (ARCA) series. Allison won two ARCA events at his home track, Talladega Superspeedway, in 1983, and was named ARCA Rookie of the Year in 1984, placing second in the series title. That same year he married his first wife, Deborah.

Allison continued racing in the ARCA series in 1985, winning eight races in the series, four at Talladega Superspeedway. He competed in some of NASCAR's lower divisions. In the Busch series, his crew chief was Red Farmer. In July 1985, car owner Hoss Ellington gave Allison an opportunity to drive a NASCAR Winston Cup Series car in the Talladega 500. Allison qualified 22nd In Ellington's Chevrolet and finished 10th in his first Winston Cup start. The wins earned Allison more NASCAR Cup Series opportunities in 1986, when he made 4 starts in the No. 95 Sadler Racing Chevrolet entry with Tom Pistone serving as crew chief. Davey later substituted for injured racer Neil Bonnett in Junior Johnson's No. 12 Budweiser Chevy, starting and finishing 7th in the Talladega 500.

Early Winston Cup career
Prior to the 1987 season, car owner Harry Ranier tapped Davey to replace veteran driver Cale Yarborough in the Ranier-Lundy No. 28 Ford Thunderbird.  Yarborough was leaving the Ranier-Lundy team to start his own operation along with the team's sponsor, Hardee's.  Ranier negotiated a sponsorship deal with Texaco's Havoline motor oil brand, a deal that was signed during the NASCAR edition of Speedweeks at Daytona International Speedway.  On qualifying day, Davey signalled that he was in Winston Cup to stay when he qualified an unmarked, but Texaco-Havoline painted No. 28 Thunderbird second for the 1987 Daytona 500, becoming the first rookie ever to start on the front row for NASCAR's most prestigious event. A pit miscue which allowed a rear tire to fall off on the track ended his hopes of a good finish in the race, but success for Davey Allison would be just around the corner.

May 3, 1987 would become an infamous day in NASCAR history. Earlier in the week, Bill Elliott had qualified his No. 9 Coors-Melling Ford Thunderbird at a record 212.809 mph (a record which still stands today) for the Winston 500 at the unlighted Talladega Superspeedway.  Davey Allison would qualify third, while father Bobby would start second alongside Elliott in the Stavola Brothers No. 22 Miller Buick.  On lap 22 of the event, Bobby Allison ran over a piece of debris, cutting his right-rear tire. The car turned sideways, lifted into the air, became airborne, and crashed vertically into the frontstretch spectator fence near the start finish line. The car landed back on the track and collected a number of other competitors. Davey was ahead of his father at the time and saw the crash unfold in his mirror. Bobby Allison was not injured, but the crash slightly injured several spectators and the race was red-flagged for two hours and thirty-eight minutes. It was this event that triggered the requirement of smaller carburetors, and later, carburetor restrictor plates on engines at Daytona and Talladega to reduce the top speeds.

When the race resumed, Allison continued to run up front and when Elliott exited the race with engine failure, his toughest competition was eliminated. With darkness falling during a late caution flag, the decision was made to end the race 10 laps short of its 188 lap distance. Running second on the restart, Allison passed leader Dale Earnhardt on the backstretch and pulled away for his first Winston Cup win. In winning the race, Allison became the first rookie since Ron Bouchard in 1981 to win a Winston Cup event.

Allison would better that feat just 28 days later by winning the Budweiser 500 at Dover International Speedway (then the Dover Downs International Speedway), becoming, at the time, the only rookie to win two Winston Cup events. In all, Allison started 22 of the 29 Winston Cup races in 1987, winning twice, and scoring nine top-five and 10 top-ten finishes.  He also won five poles in his rookie season.

The 1988 season started with much promise.  Allison again started outside the front row for the Daytona 500, the first modern day race utilizing the NASCAR-mandated carburetor restrictor plate. While father Bobby was battling up front early in the race, Davey and his team struggled with a car that was repaired during the early morning hours following a crash in the final practice session. As the race came to a conclusion, Davey found himself running second, just behind his father. Bobby Allison would go on to hold off his son and win his third Daytona 500. Father and son would celebrate their one-two finish in victory lane.

Davey Allison would struggle through much of the first half of the 1988 season as he ran some of the Winston Cup short tracks for the first time. The team was also suffering from engine failures and now sole-owner Harry Ranier was looking to sell the team. Crew chief Joey Knuckles was fired and engine builder Robert Yates replaced him. Then on June 19, at Pocono International Raceway came his father's near-fatal, career-ending crash.

With his father clinging to life in a Pennsylvania hospital, Davey Allison raced on but failed to finish the next three events. The team rebounded when the series returned to Pocono in July with Allison scoring a third-place finish.  Back at Talladega, the No. 28 Ford again suffered engine failure but Allison would drive his father's car later in the race when relief driver Mike Alexander was overcome by heat. Two races later, Allison would score his first win of the season at Michigan International Speedway.  The win changed the fortunes for the financially strapped team and after a series of top-5 and top-10 finishes, Allison would win the inaugural race at the new Richmond International Raceway. On October 1, 1988, Ranier sold the team to Yates, who temporarily remained as Allison's crew chief for the balance of the season, before undertaking full ownership. The rest of the season was a mixed bag but Allison would finish the season with a third-place finish at Phoenix International Raceway, and a second at the season ending Atlanta Journal 500 at Atlanta Motor Speedway.  He would finish eighth in the final Winston Cup standings.  But the roller coaster 1988 Winston Cup season had taken a toll on Davey Allison's marriage and he and Deborah quietly divorced during the offseason.

Initial years with Ranier Racing Racing, 1989–1990

Davey Allison's 1989 season did not start well.  A year after he and his father's one-two Daytona 500 finish, Davey started at 16th, then was involved in an early incident with Geoff Bodine that sent his car careening into the sand bar separating the track's backstretch from Lake Lloyd.  The car made one slow, complete, roll-over with Davey eventually restarting the car and driving it back to the pits.  He drove the damaged, hood-less car to a 25th-place finish and had a heated exchange with Bodine following the race (the first of several exchanges with other drivers during his career).

The team rebounded at Rockingham and when the series moved to Talladega in May for the Winston 500, Davey had scored one top-10 and three top-5 finishes.  Davey started on the pole at Talladega and got his first win of 1989, his second victory in Talladega's spring event.  After the race, Davey stood sixth in the Winston Cup Championship standings, but did not win again until the next restrictor plate race, the Pepsi 400 at Daytona, his last win of the season.  By the end of the season, Davey had collected seven top-five and 13 top-ten finishes along with one pole position to go with the two wins.  He slipped to 11th in the final Winston Cup standings.  However, Davey would marry his second wife, Liz, during the season, and their first child, Krista, was born prior to the 1990 season.

The 1990 season did not start much better than the 1989 season and by the sixth race at Bristol, Davey was a 17th in the Winston Cup standings.  A poor qualifying run had the team pitting in the backstretch pits, which usually doomed a team's chances of winning the race.  But the team owner decided against pitting on the final caution flag and Davey scored his second short-track win in a thrilling photo-finish with Mark Martin, winning by just eight inches.  But the win did not change the team's fortunes and after an ill-handling car at Dover required Davey to ask for relief from fellow Alabama driver Hut Stricklin, Robert Yates decided to hire "Suitcase" Jake Elder as the team's crew chief.  Davey won the fall event at Charlotte Motor Speedway but finished the season 13th in the final Winston Cup standings.  He again posted two wins, but only five top-five and 10 top-ten finishes.

1991 and the hiring of Larry McReynolds
The 1991 season began with much promise.  Davey won the pole for the Daytona 500 and was in contention for the win until the final laps.  After a late race restart, eventual winner Ernie Irvan passed Dale Earnhardt for the lead.  Davey tried to follow Irvan around Earnhardt but could not make the pass and the two drivers battled side by side for a few laps.  As the cars came off turn two, Earnhardt's car spun, collecting Allison and Kyle Petty.  Davey was unable to continue and finished 15th.  From there, things went downhill. Davey finished 12th at Richmond, 16th at Rockingham, then crashed hard early in the Motorcraft 500 at Atlanta, finishing 40th.  Davey was openly feuding with crew chief Elder, and Allison threatened to quit the team if Elder stayed. After the poor result at Atlanta, Robert Yates decided that he had to make a change at crew chief.

Elder was fired, and Larry McReynolds was hired away from the Kenny Bernstein team to replace him. In his first race with McReynolds at the helm, Allison finished second at the 1991 Transouth 400.  A third-place finish followed at Bristol, then a sixth at North Wilkesboro and an eighth at Martinsville.  The team finished 22nd at Talladega due to a large accident triggered by Ernie Irvan but there was no doubt the team was much improved and was destined for bigger things.

Two weeks later, Davey dominated The Winston all-star race at Charlotte, and continued his domination by winning the Coca-Cola 600 the following week, leading 263 of the race's 400 laps.  Two races later, Davey won his first road course event at then Sears Point International Raceway where he was awarded the victory after Ricky Rudd was penalized by NASCAR for spinning Allison out on the final lap. He won again at Michigan then finished third in the Pepsi 400 at Daytona.  At the halfway point of the 1991 season, Davey had climbed to fifth in the Winston Cup point standings.

After finishing 14th at Pocono, the series moved to Talladega.  As the race wound down, Davey Allison was poised for yet another win behind leader Dale Earnhardt.  But Davey was unable to get drafting help from fellow Ford Motor Company drivers and he slipped to ninth place after attempting to pass Earnhardt for the lead. In his post-race interview, Allison stated "All we needed was three inches to clear Earnhardt, when you can't get help from a fellow Ford driver, that's pitiful". In a fit of rage after the race, Allison punched a wall in the team's transporter, breaking his wrist.  The injury failed to slow him down, however as he finished a remarkable 10th on the road course at Watkins Glen, then was second at Michigan, a photo-finish in which Dale Jarrett scored his first Winston Cup victory. Davey scored back-to-back victories at Rockingham and Phoenix and entered the final race at Atlanta second in the Winston Cup standings. But a dead battery in that race relegated him to a 17th-place finish, dropping him to third in the final standings, only four points behind Ricky Rudd. Dale Earnhardt won the championship.  The final tally of the 1991 season for Davey Allison; five wins, 12 top-five and 16 top-ten finishes, and three pole positions.  It was also during the 1991 season that Davey and Liz welcomed their second child, a son, Robert Grey Allison. With Larry McReynolds at the helm, Davey Allison entered the 1992 season as a legitimate championship contender.

1992

Statistically, 1992 was Davey Allison's best season in Winston Cup racing. Davey started sixth in the 1992 Daytona 500 but was probably not quite as fast as the Junior Johnson teammates of Bill Elliott and Sterling Marlin. But the race would change dramatically on lap 92 when Elliott, Marlin, and Ernie Irvan triggered a multi-car crash at the front of the pack. Fourteen cars were eliminated, but Allison—and eventual runner-up Morgan Shepherd—somehow made it through the mess.  He would dominate the event, lead 127 laps to join his father as a Daytona 500 winner. Allison was also the only driver to lead the Daytona 500 at halfway and go on to win, until Denny Hamlin won the 2016 race.

Bill Elliott would rebound to win the next four events, but Allison was not far behind in each event, posting four top-five finishes to maintain his lead in the points. A hard crash in the Food City 500 at Bristol left him with a bruised shoulder, but the following weekend he had Jimmy Hensley on hand for relief just in case Allison could not go the distance. Allison managed to race through the pain and go the distance and won at North Wilkesboro after beating Rusty Wallace and Geoffrey Bodine off pit road with a fast pit stop and leading the remaining laps en route to victory. Another hard crash at Martinsville re-injured his ribs, but Allison rebounded yet again, leading a contingent of Fords to victory in the Winston 500 at Talladega using the same car that he won the Daytona 500 with. It would be his third victory at Talladega.  The win also put him in position to win the Winston Million if he could finish off the "small slam" with a win in either the Coca-Cola 600 at Charlotte, or the Southern 500 at Darlington.

Next up was The Winston all-star race.  One year removed from his domination of that event and the Coca-Cola 600, Davey was ready to take the spotlight again.  But this time around, there was more focus on the event itself.  Over the winter, the Musco Lighting company had installed a state-of-the-art lighting system at then Charlotte Motor Speedway.  Billed as "One Hot Night" by The Nashville Network, which was to broadcast the event, The Winston was the first superspeedway race to be held under the lights. Davey would drive the same car that he used to dominate the event one year earlier, affectionately known as "007".

In the final, 10-lap segment of the race, Dale Earnhardt led, followed by Kyle Petty and Davey.  In the third turn on the final lap, Petty got under Earnhardt's car and the GM Goodwrench Chevrolet spun.  Davey took advantage of this and jumped into the lead.  But Petty charged back and as Davey crossed the start-finish line to win the race, the two cars came together, sending the driver's side of Davey's car hard into the outside wall in a shower of sparks. An unconscious Allison was taken from his car and airlifted to a Charlotte hospital. The crash left him with a concussion, bruised lung, and a battered and bruised body.

His car, "007", was totaled. Allison would later claim to have sustained an out-of-body experience after the crash. He claimed to have awoke to see his crashed car below him as he rose away from it, and to have turned his attention away from the frantic work of the emergency workers to a bright light above, which faded and left him in darkness until he awoke later in the hospital. McReynolds stated during the FOX telecasts that the first words from Allison when he awoke in the hospital were "did we win"? McReynolds told Allison "Yes, Davey, we won". Victory celebrations went on even though the driver was not present and all crew members later went to the hospital to be with their driver.

The wreck did not deter Allison.  He finished fourth in the Coca-Cola 600 the following week despite the injuries and maintained his points lead.  He then finished 11th at Dover, 28th at Sears Point, and fifth at Pocono.  Still hanging onto the points lead and his body healing, Davey won the pole and dominated the Miller Genuine Draft 400 at Michigan, leading 158 of the race's 200 laps.  The first half of the season ended with Davey posting a 10th-place finish in the Pepsi 400 at Daytona.  At the halfway point of the season, Allison had a 46-point lead over second place Bill Elliott and a 134-point lead over third place Alan Kulwicki, and had held the points lead since the first race of the season, despite the injuries and setbacks.

That would all change as the series went back to Pocono.  Davey won the pole for the event and led 115 of the first 149 laps.  But a lengthy pit stop during a caution flag sent him to the middle of the pack.  On lap 150, Allison was charging back through the pack, followed closely by Darrell Waltrip.  The two cars made contact and Davey went sliding into the grass off Pocono's "tunnel turn".  The car went airborne and began a series of violent flips before landing on top of an infield guardrail.  Miraculously, Davey survived the crash.  He was airlifted to the hospital with a severe concussion, along with a broken arm, wrist, and collar bone.  His 33rd-place finish left him nine points behind Bill Elliott for the series title, but that seemed insignificant at the moment. Especially traumatizing was the fact that Pocono was the site of Davey's father Bobby's career-ending crash a few years earlier (see above). In fact, many worried fans wondered if the younger Allison's career was over.

Davey arrived at Talladega the following week wearing dark shades to hide eyes severely bruised in the Pocono crash, Allison famously told a reporter asking to see his eyes at the press conference, "You can see it, but its ugly". His arm was in a cast that allowed him to drive, and velcro attachments to his glove and the car's shifter knob helped him drive with less exertion, but Bobby Hillin Jr. would relieve Davey after the initial laps of the DieHard 500.  Under NASCAR rules, the driver who takes the green flag is the one assigned to the points for all drivers that drive that car during the race.  Hillin drove the No. 28 Texaco-Havoline Ford Thunderbird to a third-place finish at Talladega, helping Davey and the team keep pace with Elliott.  The team was a strong contender for the win until suffering a jack failure on a pit stop. The following week, veteran road racer Dorsey Schroeder would relieve Allison, but he could only manage a 20th-place finish.

With his body healed enough to allow him to drive an entire race, Davey headed to Michigan where he had dominated the track's earlier event.  But tragedy struck as the Michigan events began.  While practicing for the weekend's Busch Series race, Davey's younger brother, Clifford crashed hard in the third and fourth turns of Michigan International Speedway.  He would die en route to the hospital. Davey drove to a fifth-place finish in the Champion Spark Plug 400, then went home to Hueytown for Clifford's funeral. The following weekend, he crashed again at Bristol, finishing 30th. Although still in second place in the Winston Cup standings, he now trailed leader Bill Elliott by 109 points.

Davey's chance to win the Winston Million was up next as the series headed to Darlington for the Mountain Dew Southern 500, which was worth both a million dollar bonus if he could win the Small Slam, but moreover, become the fourth driver to win the Career Grand Slam. There was a promotion for the event as fake Million Dollar Bills were printed with Allison's face on them were handed out for fans. Davey led 72 laps of the event and was in contention to win, but soon after the leaders pitted for tires and fuel, rain halted the race with 69 laps left. Instead it was Darrell Waltrip, gambling that the rains would come, did not pit and was leading the race when it was red flagged.  He was declared the winner as darkness fell and the rains continued. Waltrip, who had long feuded with the entire Allison clan (Bobby and Donnie;  ironically, Waltrip had replaced Donnie Allison with the DiGard team in 1975 and was a relief driver for one of Donnie's wins at Talladega), sat next to his car on pit road in lawn chair and held a colorful umbrella, gleefully joking that the rain shower was worth "one million dollars" to him as he became the fourth driver to finish a Career Grand Slam. (This was the second time Waltrip prevented a driver from clinching a Small Slam; in 1985, he stopped Bill Elliott's 1985 run at a Small Slam at Charlotte and Elliott has yet to win that leg of the Grand Slam; Elliott would take the Small Slam at Darlington in September; Dale Earnhardt stopped Waltrip's Small Slam and Career Grand Slam attempt three years previously at Darlington.) Davey finished fifth and was now 119 points behind Elliott, who finished third.

Allison and Elliott continued their drive for the championship after Darlington as the two kept pace with each other. But beginning with the Goody's 500 at Martinsville on September 28, Elliott's hold on the points lead began to slip. He finished 30th in that event while Allison finished 16th. Then at North Wilkesboro, Allison posted an 11th-place finish, while Elliott finished 26th. Back at Charlotte, Allison finished a 19th, but Elliott finished 30th and there were now four drivers within 100 points of Elliott...Allison, Alan Kulwicki, Mark Martin, and Harry Gant. Martin and Kulwicki finished first and second respectively at Charlotte, and Kulwicki was continuing a late season charge. Three races prior to Charlotte, Kulwicki had crashed and finished 34th at Dover leaving him 278 points behind Elliott and in fourth place in the standings.

Elliott's skid stopped temporarily at Rockingham where he finished fourth.  Davey finished 10th and Kulwicki 12th and entering the final two races of the 1992 season, Davey was 70 points behind Elliott in second, with Kulwicki 85 points behind in third. But Davey's fortunes changed dramatically at Phoenix as he won the event by beating his closest rivals off of pit road, and Elliott finished 31st.  Davey now had the points lead for the first time since his violent Pocono crash, and was 30 points ahead of Kulwicki, and 40 ahead of Elliott, who had slipped to third in the standings. Also in contention to win the championship as the series moved to the final race at Atlanta were Harry Gant (fourth place, 97 points behind), Kyle Petty (fifth place, 98 points behind), and Mark Martin (sixth place, 113 points behind).

The 1992 Hooters 500 would be a milestone race in NASCAR Winston Cup history. It would be the final race of Richard Petty's career, as well as the first for future Winston Cup Champion Jeff Gordon.  Couple that with the closest championship race in history, and the race was destined to be a classic. Davey Allison entered the race needing only to finish fifth or better to win the Winston Cup. A first lap incident involving Rick Mast caused minor damage to Davey's car, and he battled through much of the race to stay in the top ten.

Meanwhile, Elliott and Kulwicki were staging a battle for the ages, battling for and swapping the lead through much of the event. Late in the race, Davey had finally managed to reach the top five and was in position to win the championship when Ernie Irvan lost control of his car on the frontstretch on lap 286.  Davey could not avoid Irvan's spinning car and plowed into the No. 4 Kodak Chevrolet Lumina.  Allison's tumultuous 1992 season was over, his championship hopes lost as Elliott and Kulwicki finished first and second in the race respectively.  Kulwicki, an independent driver who had turned down offers to drive for other teams, including Junior Johnson, won the championship by leading one more lap than Elliott (103 to 102).

1993

Though 1992 had been a heartbreaking year for Davey Allison and the Robert Yates Racing team in more ways than one, they had to be encouraged by their run for the championship.  But 1993 opened on a sour note with Allison finishing 28th at Daytona.  That finish was followed by a 16th at Rockingham, but Davey rebounded to win at Richmond the following week. The next race at Atlanta was delayed a week by a blizzard that blanketed much of the Southeast. Morgan Shepherd won the race and Davey finished 13th.  He then posted an 11th at Darlington. Despite the early season struggles, Davey was sixth in the Winston Cup standings, while defending series champ Kulwicki was ninth.

Davey Allison had debuted in the International Race of Champions (IROC) in 1992, but his injuries forced him to miss the last two races.

Three days after Kulwicki's death in an airplane crash, Davey Allison finished fifth in an emotional race at Bristol. He followed that finish with a fourth at North Wilkesboro, second at Martinsville, seventh at Talladega, and 15th at Sears Point. He finished a 30th in the Coca-Cola 600 at Charlotte, but rebounded at Dover, finishing third. He was sixth at Pocono, but finished 35th at Michigan and 31st at Daytona. Halfway through the 1993 season, Davey was fifth in the point standings, but was 323 points behind leader Dale Earnhardt.  Still, Davey and the Robert Yates team were confident that they could put their early season struggles and inconsistency behind them and could make a run for the championship in the second half. The inaugural race at New Hampshire International Speedway proved the team's optimism was not unfounded. Davey led 38 laps of the event and finished third behind Rusty Wallace and Mark Martin.

Death

On July 12, 1993, Allison boarded his newly acquired Hughes 369HS helicopter to fly to Talladega Superspeedway to watch family friend Neil Bonnett and his son David Bonnett test a car for David's Busch Series debut. He picked up another family friend, racer Red Farmer, en route to the track. Allison was attempting to land the helicopter inside a fenced-in area of the track infield when the craft nosed up suddenly, then crashed. Neil Bonnett freed the semi-conscious Farmer from the wreckage, but Allison was unresponsive and could not be freed until paramedics arrived. Farmer went on to a lengthy but successful recovery, but Allison never regained consciousness after sustaining a critical head injury. He was pronounced dead at 7:00 a.m. the next morning by a neurosurgeon at Carraway Methodist Medical Center in Birmingham after a procedure to relieve pressure on his brain proved unsuccessful.

The National Transportation Safety Board (NTSB) blamed the crash on Allison's inexperience in helicopters, coupled with the decision to attempt a downwind landing. In early 1994, Allison's estate filed a lawsuit against McDonnell-Douglas claiming the cause of the crash was a failure of the collective yoke on the helicopter. Birmingham attorney Jim Thompson presented evidence from a metallurgist showing that the cast metal piece contained air pockets and paint inside the part, claiming “that meant the part was defective the day it left the factory.” A test pilot reconstruction showed identical results to Allison's crash. McDonnell-Douglas and the Allison estate reached a confidential settlement out of court in early 1996.

Thousands packed the auditorium at St. Aloysius Church in Bessemer, Alabama, to pay their respects at his funeral. He is buried near his brother, Clifford, in Bessemer's Highland Memorial Gardens. His organs except his corneas were donated.

After the final race of the season, series champion Dale Earnhardt and race winner Rusty Wallace drove a side-by-side Polish Victory Lap carrying flags for fallen drivers Alan Kulwicki and Allison. In his short NASCAR Winston Cup career, Allison posted 19 wins, 66 top-five finishes, and 92 top-ten finishes. He also won 14 poles and earned $6,724,174.  He was survived by his wife, Liz, and two children: daughter Krista Marie and son Robert "Robbie" Grey.

Tribute

Ten years after Allison's first win, Texaco debuted the throwback Battlestar paint scheme in his memory. It ran two races, but in the second, at the 1997 DieHard 500 in October, Ernie Irvan put the throwback Battlestar on the pole. Later, Texaco would often use the throwback paint scheme for their drivers at the track until they discontinued sponsorship.

The R. K. Allen Oil Company, the Talladega-based distributor for Texaco in the area, remembered the legacy of Allison with the Talladega-Texaco Walk of Fame in Talladega, where fans vote drivers, past and present, to a specially themed "hall of fame" for drivers. The induction ceremony takes place at the 1000Bulbs.com 500 weekend.

Talladega Walk of Fame members
Note: From 1994 to 2003, two drivers were inducted in the inactive driver category.  From 2003 to 2012, one inactive driver was voted, unlike the past.  Since 2013, the Talladega Walk of Fame Board of Directors has nominated one driver when necessary.  The Board of Directors also inducted an active driver in 2000.

Notes

The Walk of Fame induction was moved from July to October in 1997, and was in September in 2003.
Hamilton was voted by fans to the Walk of Fame in 2000; the Board of Directors did not want the retiring Waltrip, whose 84 wins was the most by a driver who started his career after 1972 (when the schedule was reduced to the current format) to be inducted as an inactive driver, so he was automatically inducted by the board.  It should be known Waltrip was very unpopular at Talladega in his prime for his feuds with all three Allisons, starting when he replaced Donnie in the DiGard racing car in 1975;  ironically, it was Waltrip who was a relief driver driving when Donnie won the 1977 Talladega 500.  Also, Waltrip's associate sponsor was the Havoline brand of oil from 1993-97 (co-branding with Sears) and again in 1999-2000 (Texaco was associated with Kmart-sponsored cars fielded by Carl Haas, with both Newman-Haas Racing in CART and Haas-Carter Racing in 2000).  In the 2010's, Waltrip's daughter Sarah Kaitlin graduated from Samford University in the Birmingham area;  coincidentally, Davey Allison's widow and children moved shortly after his death to the Nashville area where Waltrip lives, where son Robert Grey graduated from Middle Tennessee State University.
The Board of Directors of the Talladega-Texaco Walk of Fame inducted the inaugural class by decree in 1994.

Legacy

Allison was leading the IROC series championship at the time of his death, with one race remaining in the four race series. Terry Labonte drove the final race in place of Allison and secured the championship for him. His championship money, $175,000, was set up as a trust fund for his children. Allison finished 31st in the final 1993 NASCAR Championship Standings and earned officially half of the 1993 owner points fund for the #28 team.

Racing Champions produced a die-cast model of Allison's 1989 Texaco car as a tribute after his death, as well as his standard 1993 scheme in the main line of die-cast. Racing Champions also made die-cast replicas of cars Allison drove during his career in the Racing Champions Premier line, with a trading card that read "Champion Forever". A promotional die-cast 28 car was released with Allison's replacement, Ernie Irvan listed as driver to pay tribute to the team's win at Martinsville in the fall of 1993. Only 20,000 of them were released.

Allison was posthumously inducted into the International Motorsports Hall of Fame in 1998, and in 2018 he was announced as an inductee of the NASCAR Hall of Fame where he was formally inducted in 2019.

Allison became a figure in a controversy as his widow became involved with country music star Joe Diffie shortly after Allison's death. Tabloid television programs and newspapers gave much coverage to the story at the time, with some claiming that the two had been lovers before Allison's death.  Liz has openly discussed her relationship with Diffie, most recently on the Paul Finebaum Radio Network during the week of the 2006 race at Talladega. Liz expressed some regret over the relationship and mentioned that she and Diffie were band-aids for each other, and band aids were not meant to be permanent.

Liz Allison and their two children moved to Nashville and she married physical therapist Ryan Hackett on May 13, 2000. After being divorced for four years, Bobby and Judy Allison reunited at the wedding, after nearly seven years of tragedy had separated them.

On April 28, 2003, the mayor of Hueytown, Alabama, declared it Davey Allison Day and is celebrated on the weekend of the springtime Talladega race.

Due to Allison's death, Robert Yates initially chose not to field a car at the 1993 Miller Genuine Draft 400, stating "It's hard to race with tears in your eyes". Yates would return to Talladega with Robby Gordon replacing Allison in the No. 28, but he lost control of the Texaco/Havoline Ford early in the race and crashed and finished last. Lake Speed would take over driving duties until the 1993 Southern 500. Ernie Irvan, would later take over the ride at the Mountain Dew Southern 500 and won the Goody's 500 at Martinsville Speedway and it was a heartwarming time for Irvan's crew as it marked their first time back to victory lane since Allison's death. Irvan would also win the Mello Yello 500 at Charlotte as well. Racing Champions ran the No. 28 Havoline Ford with Ernie Irvan replacing Allison as the driver in tribute of the win.

Allison also had his own brand of chili by Bunker Hill with his face on the can. Allison also had a comic book printed about him during his racing days.

A road called "Allison-Bonnett Memorial Drive" in his hometown is honored by him, along with fellow native Neil Bonnett, who died a year after Davey.

In the videogames NASCAR 99, NASCAR 2000 and NASCAR Rumble, he appears as an unlockable NASCAR Legend with his Texaco Ford that he drove from 1987 to 1989.

Allison's livery style has been used as tributes by Ford (Robert Yates NASCAR Hall of Fame), Dr. Pepper / 7 Up Group (an associate sponsor of Allison in 1992 and 93), and Chevron (at least two occasions, primarily at Talladega, the Battlestar livery has been used as a retro livery).  Most notably, Irvan put the 1987 Battlestar livery on the pole at the October 1997 Talladega race, much to the delight of fans.

In the 2021 GEICO 500, Joey Gase and his Rick Ware Racing No. 53 team would run a tribute scheme for Davey Allison. The car started 35th and finished 34th.

Motorsports career results

NASCAR
(key) (Bold – Pole position awarded by qualifying time. Italics – Pole position earned by points standings or practice time. * – Most laps led.)

Winston Cup Series

Daytona 500

Busch Series

ARCA Permatex SuperCar Series
(key) (Bold – Pole position awarded by qualifying time. Italics – Pole position earned by points standings or practice time. * – Most laps led.)

International Race of Champions
(key) (Bold – Pole position. * – Most laps led.)

See also
 List of all-time NASCAR Cup Series winners
 List of Daytona 500 winners 
 List of Daytona 500 pole position winners
 List of fatalities from aviation accidents
 List of NASCAR All-Star Race drivers
 List of people from Alabama
 Alabama Gang 
 List of sportspeople who died during their careers
 NASCAR's 50 Greatest Drivers
 NASCAR Winston Cup Series era

References

External links

 
 
 NTSB report on the crash. 
 Widow Liz's official site.

1961 births
1993 deaths
People from Hueytown, Alabama
Racing drivers from Alabama
NASCAR drivers
International Race of Champions drivers
American Speed Association drivers
ISCARS Dash Touring Series drivers
Accidental deaths in Alabama
Aviators killed in aviation accidents or incidents in the United States
Burials in Alabama
International Motorsports Hall of Fame inductees
Sportspeople from Hollywood, Florida
Racing drivers from Florida
Alabama Gang
Texaco
Hueytown High School alumni
Victims of aviation accidents or incidents in 1993
Victims of helicopter accidents or incidents in the United States
Robert Yates Racing drivers
NASCAR Hall of Fame inductees